The University of Douai is a former university in Douai, France. With a medieval heritage of scholarly activities in Douai, the university was established in 1559 and lectures started in 1562. It closed from 1795 to 1808. In 1887, it was transferred as University of Lille 27 km away from Douai.

From the mid-16th century onwards, the university of Douai had Europe-wide influence as a prominent centre of neo-Latin literature, contributing also to the dissemination of printed knowledge. With 1,500 to 2,000 registered students and several hundred professors, it was the second largest university of France during the late-17th and 18th centuries.  Studies in mathematics and physics at the Douai Faculty of Arts enabled broad development in artillery practice. The Douai Faculty of Theology was an important center for Catholic scholarship. It played a role in religious doctrines and political controversies in Europe; its scholars participated in the development of new approaches to the humanities.

History

Douai, scholar pole from the late Middle Ages to the Renaissance 
Before the formal establishment of a university, scholarly traditions in Douai dated back to the late Middle Ages. Near Douai, Anchin Abbey was an important cultural center from the 11th century to the 13th century, producing many manuscripts and charters; it was rivalled by the scriptoria of Marchiennes Abbey and Flines Abbey. In addition to the scholarly activities at these abbeys, there were other monastic houses in Douai, thus ensuring during the 16th century that "close to the city, several very rich abbeys could provide space and resources to the new university".

The bonds of vassalage tying the County of Flanders to the Kingdom of France were abolished in 1526, with Flanders becoming an imperial province under the Treaty of Madrid (1526), signed by King Francis I of France and Charles V, Holy Roman Emperor, and confirmed by the Treaty of Cambrai (1529). It is therefore to the emperor that the magistrates of Douai sent a request in 1531 to create a university in the town. Formal approval of the university was only granted during the reign of Philip II of Spain, due to the evolving political and religious context.

Old university of Douai (1559–1795)

Establishment of the university (1559) 
As part of a general programme of consolidation of the Spanish Low Countries, in 1559–1562 a university was first established in the town by Philip II, in some sense a sister-university to Leuven University, founded in 1426.  The foundation was confirmed by a Bull of Pope Paul IV on 31 July 1559, confirmed by Pope Pius IV on 6 January 1560. The letters patent of Philip II, dated 19 January 1561, authorized five faculties: Theology, Canon Law, Civil Law, Medicine, and Arts. The formal inauguration took place on 5 October 1562, when there was a public procession of the Blessed Sacrament, and a sermon was preached in the market-place by François Richardot, the Bishop of Arras.  The university's first chancellor was the Englishman Richard Smith.

Recent studies are coming to view the 16th century foundation of the University of Douai as an important institution of its time, and efforts are being made to reconstruct a portrait of the different aspects of its life, including prosopographies of its professors and students, especially for its Habsburg period.

College du Roi (1562), College d'Anchin (1568) and College de Marchiennes (1570) 
The first university college established at Douai was the "College du Roi" (King's college), which opened in 1562. A second college was established in 1564 but was replaced by the College d'Anchin (1568). Another college supported by the Abbey of Marchiennes opened in 1570. These colleges were not only places of accommodation for students but also places of lectures. Royal appointed lecturers represent only a tenth of the three hundred teachers in the faculty. The faculty of the Jesuit College included up to 145 teachers and was considered as the most important center of power in the university.

English College in Douai (1562–1793) 

Although the university was founded on the model of Louvain, from which it also drew the majority of the first professors, it also felt the influence of the English in its early years, several of the chief posts being held by Englishmen, mostly from Oxford. This makes it reasonable to suppose that many of the traditions of Catholic Oxford were perpetuated at Douai. The University's first Chancellor was Dr Richard Smyth, former Fellow of Merton College, Oxford and Regius Professor of Divinity at Oxford. The Regius Professor of Canon Law at Douai for many years was Dr Owen Lewis, a former Fellow of New College, Oxford who had held the corresponding post at Oxford. The first principal of Marchiennes College was Richard White (Richard Gwyn), another former Fellow of New College, while after taking his licentiate at Douai in 1560, William Allen became Regius Professor of Divinity there.

The founding of the University of Douai coincided with the presence of a large number of English Catholics living at Douai, in the wake of the accession of Elizabeth I and the reimposition of Protestantism in England. This presence, and the role of the University prompted William Allen to found a seminary in Douai in 1569 for English Catholic priests, whose studies were in part linked to the University and who were trained there to return to their country. It was at this English College at Douai that the English translation of the Bible known as the Douay–Rheims Version was completed in 1609. The first English Catholic Bible incorporating the Rheims New Testament and the Douay Old Testament in a single volume was not printed until 1764.

Scottish College in Douai (1573–1802)

The Scottish College was established in 1573 by bishop John Lesley, who objected to the Scottish Reformation and to destabilization of the Auld Alliance between France and Scotland by Protestant England. It was refounded in 1608. After Douai's conquest by the French, the Scots living there automatically had dual French and Scots citizenship under the Auld Alliance. The college in Douai hosted scholars from the Scottish Stuart supporter movement and also refugees from Jacobite risings, especially between 1688 and 1692. Historical collections were left there by king James II of England and VII of Scotland (last Catholic monarch of Great Britain) and by exiled Scottish Catholics.

Irish College in Douai (1603–1905)

St. Patrick Irish college of Douai was founded in 1603 by Christopher Cusack, with the support of Philip III of Spain, an ally of the Irish Catholics against the colonization of Ireland by the English power. Hugh Ó Neill, 2nd Earl of Tyrone, leader of the Irish resistance during the Nine Years' War in Ireland, stayed at Douai university on his way to exile from Ireland to Rome in 1607. The Irish College was attached to the Faculty of Theology of the University of Douai in 1610.

Bronchorst scholarship foundation (1629)
By his will dated 20 June 1629, Henry Bronchorst founded a scholarship for a period of nine years for members of the Seven noble houses of Brussels to study at the University of Douai, which explains the significant number of members of the Brussels magistrate who were educated at this university.

Other foundations
The town was a vibrant centre of Catholic life and connected with the University were not only the English College, but also the Irish and Scottish colleges (i.e. seminaries), and Benedictine, Jesuit and Franciscan houses. For a time there was also a Charterhouse.  The Collège d'Anchin was opened a few months after the English College, endowed by the Abbot of the neighbouring monastery of Anchin, and entrusted to the Jesuits.  In 1570 the Abbot of Marchiennes founded a college for the study of law. The Abbot of Saint-Vast founded a college of that name. Later on, we find the College of St. Thomas Aquinas, belonging to the Dominicans, the Collège du Roi, and others.

The Benedictines established a college at Douai, founded by Augustine Bradshaw in 1605, in hired apartments belonging to the Collège d'Anchin, but a few years later, through the generosity of Philippe de Caverel, Abbot of the monastery of Saint-Vaast, they obtained land and built a monastery, which was opened in 1611. The house acquired a high reputation for learning, being rebuilt between 1776 and 1781, and many of the professors of the university were at different times chosen from among its members.  (The Anglo-Benedictines went into English exile on the French Revolution and were the only Douai institution to retain  their ancient monastery after it; and as the community of St Gregory was then permanently established at Downside, they handed over their house at Douai to the community of St Edmund, which had formerly been located in Paris. These Benedictines carried on a school at Douai until 1903, when Waldeck-Rousseau's 1901 Law of Associations caused them to leave France. They returned to England, and settled at Woolhampton, near Reading, founding Douai Abbey there, known for its school – Douai School – which closed in 1999.)

The Benedictine and Franciscan houses at Douai were near together and were both bound up in their history with the restoration of the respective orders in England. The Franciscan monastery was founded mainly through the instrumentality of Father John Gennings, the brother of the martyr, Edmund Gennings. It was established in temporary quarters in 1618, the students for the time attending the Jesuit schools; but by 1621 they had built a monastery and provided for all necessary tuition within their own walls.

Heyday
Something of the feel of the university's quality can be gained from the work of some of its professors. Among them were Estius (Willem Hessels van Est), (1542–1613), the commentator on the Pauline epistles. He had studied classics at Utrecht and afterwards spent some twenty years at Louvain, in the study of philosophy, theology and Holy Scripture, and in 1580 received the degree of Doctor of Theology. In 1582 he became Professor of Theology at Douai, a position which he retained for thirty-one years and which he combined for the last eighteen years of his life with that of Chancellor of the University, in addition to being for many years rector of the diocesan seminary. Estius's works were written in Latin and for the greater part published posthumously.

In the 18th century, the University of Douai was the second largest in the kingdom of France by number of students, with a total student registration ranging between 1,500 and 2,000.

Closed university during the French Revolution (1795–1808)
The university was suppressed during the French Revolution and its libraries' holdings transferred to the town's Bibliothèque Municipale (founded by Louis XV in 1767), which also received the collections of the Jesuits of the College of Anchin. A good part of these collections was however destroyed when the library was burnt as a consequence of bombardment on August 11, 1944, in the aftermath of the World War II Normandy landings.

Modern university of Douai (1808–1887)
Douai Faculties of Letters and sciences were re-established in 1808. Douai regained a Faculty of Law in 1854, but in 1887 this was transferred to Lille. Currently the University of Lille and the "Artois University" who make up a part of the Community of Universities and Institutions Lille Nord de France regard themselves as successors to Philip II's University of Douai.

Transformation as University of Lille (1896) 

In 1887, all faculties in Douai were relocated in the neighbouring city of Lille. The University of Lille was then established in 1896 with all faculties including Sciences, Law, Medicine and Pharmacy, Literature and Humanities.

Faculties

Faculties of the old University of Douai

Faculty of Arts (1562–1795)

The Faculty of Arts in Douai had intense activity and conferred Master of Arts degrees, which was a prerequisite to study theology and law. Just as at the  universities of Louvain and Paris, obtaining this MA degree from the Faculty of Arts was the first and mandatory step before undertaking studies in other faculties.

The University of Douai's fame was in Philosophy and Mathematics, through (or in competition with) the Jesuit college in particular. "The Faculty of Arts had three chairs (History, Hebrew, Greek) until 1704, when a chair of mathematics was created (...). A chair in hydrography has been in place since 1704."

"Among the faculties, it was Mathematics in the sixteenth century, and the reshaping of the Mathematics chair by the Marquis de Pommereuil in 1705 that gave new splendour to optics, geometry, astronomy, architecture, military use of alloy chemistry, trigonometry, to ensure the training of good army officers. Mathematics and Science in Douai were made illustrious in the early seventeenth century by the mathematician Charles Malapert, who discovered sunspots – probably before Kirchner, whom he met in Ingolstadt – and in the second half of the century by Anthony Thomas, a Jesuit successor of Verbiest in China, to chair the tribunal of Mathematics in Beijing. This correspondent of the Academy of Sciences has left a major work."

In 1679 the first school for artillery officers in France was established in Douai by King Louis XIV.

"In the eighteenth century (...) in philosophy, the Douai faculty gave preference to the mathematical logic. Hence the growth in this area of knowledge in the program included (...) physics: mechanics, mathematics, physics itself, optics, perspective, astronomy, cosmography, elements of natural history (chemistry, history, geography, philology). This maths focus was vital for the training of military and naval officers; Douai also possessed a rich library, a museum of ethnology and archeology and a museum of natural sciences (...) Despite the Church distrust regarding sciences, Douai followed closely the developments of science, which stimulated discoveries."

It was not until 1750 that the French language supplanted Latin, those this process was not completed until the French Revolution.

By the French law of 8 Prairial IV (1795), it was in the neighbouring city of Lille and not in Douai that an Ecole centrale de Lille was established, as a successor of the Douai Faculty of Arts. Douai itself regained a science faculty only in 1808.

Faculty of Theology (1562–1793) 

It is in this faculty that the Douay–Rheims Bible was established.

Three two-year course at the Faculty of Theology ensure the successive grades of bachelor, licentiate and doctor.

We can have an idea of the quality of the University in what were seeing what some of his professors. Among the most famous, who are many, just to cite Estius (1542–1613), the famous commentator of the epistles of Paul. After classical studies at Utrecht, he then spent two decades in Leuven, studying philosophy, theology and Scripture and in 1580 he received the degree of doctor of theology. In 1582 he became professor of theology at Douai, a position he held for thirty-one years, and he joined her in the last eighteen years of his life with that of Chancellor of the university, while also being the many years rector of the diocesan seminary. The works of Estius were written in Latin and for the most part, their publications were posthumous. Note also Lessius Leonardus (1554–1623), professing the philosophy, and François du Bois, said Franciscus Sylvius (1581–1649) [38], professor of theology and vice-chancellor of the University, but also Nemius Gaspard Dubois, George Colveneere, and Philippe Bossuet Cospéan which involved in the controversy of Douai.

Major doctrinal debates took place within the Faculty of Theology, first Gallicanism opponents with the Déclaration des Quatre articles that originally was opposed at Douai in 1683, then between Jesuits and Jansenists. After the first European fame instilled by Estius, "the Faculty of Theology is the most prestigious of all, René Descartes goes there several times to discuss his Discourse on the Method with academics, Francis Sylvius especially", the One of the greatest theologians of his century and the first ornament of the university, which took part against the Augustinus of the Bishop of Ypres, Jansenius. [40] Pro-Jansenius academics were exiled by lettre de cachet in 1692 in an episode referred to as the Fourberie de Douai (Cheating of Douai).

Faculty of Law (1562–1795) 

The faculties of canon law and civil law had an intense activity from the establishment of the University of Douai to the French Revolution. The Parliament of Flanders had its seat at Douai from 1713 and subsequently became the Court of Appeal of Douai, a fact which encouraged law schools in Douai.
One student emblematic of Douai law faculty is Philippe-Antoine Merlin de Douai. Law schools have trained many lawyers in Flanders, such as Adrian Maillart, François Modius, François Patou, Jacques Pollet, Mathieu Pinault, Cesar Baggio and Bertrand Cahuac.

Faculty of Medicine (1562–1793) 

The faculty of medicine in Douai lives in the shadow of other more famous faculties, but is not at the tip of his time: it has a medical anatomical theater as early as 1700 . The names of Amé Bourdon for surgery and anatomy, Michel Brisseau in ophthalmology and Jean-Baptiste Lestiboudois in medicine and botany reflect the teachings at the Faculty of Medicine.

In 1805, a school of medicine was establied in Lille, as the successor of the school of surgery founded in Lille in 1705. It overshadowed medical education in Douai. Its heir is now part of the University of Lille.

Faculties of the modern University of Douai

Faculty of sciences (1808–1815) 
A faculty of sciences was re-established in 1808. However, higher education in sciences moved to Lille and its faculty of sciences inaugurated by Louis Pasteur. Its heir is today part of the University of Lille.

Faculty of Law (1854–1887) 
The faculty of law in Douai was moved to Lille in 1887. Its heir is today part of the University of Lille.

Faculty of literature (1808–1815, 1854–1887)
A faculty of literature was reestablished in 1808 and transferred to Lille in 1887. Its heir today is part of the University of Lille.

Influence of the university of Douai

Dissemination of printed knowledge 
Douai was a prominent center of neo-Latin literature.

Douai was known not only for his intellectual activity, but also for his many master printers, involved in the dissemination of knowledge primarily in Latin, but also in French in the southern Netherlands.

Douay–Rheims Bible and catholic studies 

Douai was an important center for Catholic Studies. When the Holy See authorized the translation of the Bible into vernacular languages, the Douay–Rheims Bible was the first authorized Catholic bible translated from Latin into English in 1609 and its subsequent revisions were references to the Catholic Bible in English . This is a Douai–Rheims Bible John Fitzgerald Kennedy took the oath as President of the United States in 1961.

In seminars Douai that was formed much of the English Catholic clergy from the Counter-Reformation. The preacher trained in Douai clergy also swarmed into colonies, such as Pierre-Philippe Potier in New France, Charles Carroll Maryland Colon and Nicolas Trigault in China.

Religious and political influence 
University of Douai was the center of religious debate to the political implications. Created to counter the Protestant Reformation, the court also dismissed the royal power by his fight against Bossuet and the Gallican. Its independence on the face of temporal power is due to its history on the border between the Spanish Netherlands and the Kingdom of France. The chancellors and officials of the university were advisers of the Catholic kings of Spain and France. The board of the University of Douai had relations with the courts of Louis XIV and Louis XV, including through Philip Cospéan and Bossuet, and was also related to Popes who originally contributed to the financial support of some of his colleagues. During the French Revolution in 1791, the clergy began university Douaisian conditions before considering to take an oath to the Civil Constitution of the clergy, following the brief quod aliquantum of March 10, 1791 and Caritas of April 13, 1791 issued by the Pope. These conditions were interpreted as a rejection of loyalty to Republican power.

Humanities and modernity 

Even though many works of the 18th century encyclopaedists, such as the Encyclopedia of Diderot and D'Alembert, and later works, such as the Grand dictionnaire universal dictionary of the 19th century, were blacklisted, the university was gradually imbued with ideas of modernity, the scientific revolution and the great discoveries. Witness the early work in mathematics, and anatomy, setting default the system of Galen, and the accompanying changes in botanical and zoological classifications, respectively, studied at Douai by Richard Gibbons [53] and Charles Malapert, Ame Bourdon Jean-Baptiste Lestiboudois.

Notable students and faculty

 William Allen
 William Bawden
 George Blackwell
 Amé Bourdon
 John Bowles
 Charles Carroll the Settler
 Richard Challoner
 François d'Aguilon
 Cornelis de Jode
 Thomas Dempster
 Franciscus Sylvius
 Grégoire de Saint-Vincent
 Olivier De Wree
 Nicholas Fitzherbert
 Edward Hawarden
 Giles Hussey
 Cuthbert Mayne
 Philippe-Antoine Merlin de Douai
 Daniel O'Connell
 Georges Palante
 John Payne
 Robert Southwell
 Honoré Tournély
 Charles Townley
 Nicolas Trigault
 Jean Vendeville
 Peter Wadding

Notes

Sources

FASTI, a project on the history of universities
H. de Ridder-Symoens, "The Place of the University of Douai in the Peregrinatio Academica Britannica", in Lines of Contact: Proceedings of the Second Conference of Belgian, British, Irish and Dutch historians of universities held in St Anne's College, Oxford, 15–17 September 1989, edited by Hilde De Ridder-Symoens and John M. Fletcher (Ghent, 1994), pp. 21–34.
Andreas Loewe, "Richard Smyth and the Foundation of the University of Douai", Nederlands Archief voor Kerkgeschiedenis, 79 II (1999).
Andreas Loewe, Richard Smyth and the Language of Orthodoxy : Re-Imagining Tudor Catholic Polemicism, Brill, Leiden, 2003 (= Studies in Medieval and Reformation Traditions).

See also 

 List of early modern universities in Europe

Acknowledgment

University of Douai
Defunct universities and colleges in France
History of Nord (French department)
Universities in Hauts-de-France
1562 establishments in France
Educational institutions established in the 1560s
1795 disestablishments in France
University of Douai